Because We Hate You is an album by American rock group the Young Fresh Fellows, one half of a split album with The Minus 5, released in 2001 on Mammoth Records.

Track listing
All songs written by Scott McCaughey except as indicated.

"Barky's Spiritual Store"
"Lonely Spartanburg Flower Stall"
"I Wonder What She's Doing Tonite" (Boyce and Hart)
"For the Love of a Girl"
"Fuselage"
"My Drum Set"
"Worthless"
"She's a Book"
"Good Times Rock 'n' Roll" (McCaughey, Kurt Bloch, Todd Hutchison, Jim Sangster)
"Little Bell"
"Summerland"
"Mamie Dunn, Employee of The Month"
"Your Truth, Our Lies" (Croaker Norge, Batum Schrag)
"The Ballad of Only You and the Can Prevent Forest Fires"

See also
 Let the War Against Music Begin

The Young Fresh Fellows albums
2001 albums
Mammoth Records albums